Amazonas Motos Especiais, commonly shortened to Amazonas or AME, was a Brazilian manufacturer of motorcycles and automobiles.

History 
In 1978, production of motorcycles began in plants in São Paulo and Manaus. The vehicles were also exported to the United States and to Europe and Japan. In 1986 there was a change of ownership. From 1987, automobiles and kit cars were also produced. Production ended in 1988. In total, about 700 motorcycles and a few cars were produced.

Production 
The range included large motorcycles similar to those from Harley-Davidson. An air-cooled four-cylinder boxer engine from VW do Brasil with 1600 cc displacement powered the vehicles. A sidecar was available from 1982.

In March 1987, the Porsche 550 replica was presented at a São Paulo International Motor Show. A tubular frame formed the basis. An open body made of fiberglass was mounted on it. The VW engine with either 1600 cm³, 1800 cm³ or 2160 cm³ displacement was placed behind the seats in mid-engine design. Production of 10 to 16 vehicles per month was planned. Already in the same year, the production of this model ended when Porsche decided to give the license to Chamonix NG Cars.

Relaunch 
In 2006, the company resumed activities with new models and with the collaboration of the Loncin Corporation, with its headquarters in the Manaus.

Fate 
No motorcycle has left the assembly line since 2009, after the partnership with the Chinese brand ended, the company went bankrupt.

Past models 
Cruisers 
Amazonas 1600 (1978-1988)
Amazonas 250 (2006-2009)
Scooters
Amazonas 110 (2006-2009)
Amazonas 125 (2006-2009)
Amazonas 150 (2008-2009)

References

External links
 Moto website

Companies based in São Paulo (state)
1978 establishments in Brazil
1989 disestablishments in Brazil
2006 establishments in Brazil
2009 disestablishments in Brazil
Brazilian brands
Defunct motorcycle manufacturers of Brazil
Defunct motor vehicle manufacturers of Brazil
Manaus
Scooter manufacturers
Vehicle manufacturing companies established in 1978
Vehicle manufacturing companies established in 2006
Vehicle manufacturing companies disestablished in 1989
Vehicle manufacturing companies disestablished in 2009